In mathematics, Ono's inequality is a theorem about triangles in the Euclidean plane. In its original form, as conjectured by T. Ono in 1914, the inequality is actually false; however, the statement is true for acute triangles and right triangles, as shown by F. Balitrand in 1916.

Statement of the inequality

Consider an acute or right triangle in the Euclidean plane with side lengths a, b and c and area A. Then

This inequality fails for general triangles (to which Ono's original conjecture applied), as shown by the counterexample  

The inequality holds with equality in the case of an equilateral triangle, in which up to similarity we have sides  and area

See also
List of triangle inequalities

References

External links

 

Disproved conjectures
Triangle inequalities